Dryobota is a genus of moths of the family Noctuidae.

Species
 Dryobota labecula (Esper, 1788)

References
Natural History Museum Lepidoptera genus database
Dryobota at funet

Cuculliinae